Veivatnet is a lake in the municipality of Ullensvang in Vestland county, Norway. The  lake lies on the vast Hardangervidda plateau, inside Hardangervidda National Park.

See also
List of lakes in Norway

References

Ullensvang
Lakes of Vestland